Rosemary Clooney Sings the Music of Cole Porter is a 1982 album by Rosemary Clooney, of songs by Cole Porter.

Track listing
 "In the Still of the Night" – 3:22
 "My Heart Belongs to Daddy" – 4:10
 "I Get a Kick Out of You" – 3:43
 "Get Out of Town" – 3:22
 "I Concentrate on You" – 5:53
 "Just One of Those Things" – 4:07
 "I've Got You Under My Skin" – 3:52
 "It's De-Lovely" – 3:09
 "You're the Top" – 3:14
 "Anything Goes" – 3:01

All music and lyrics by Cole Porter.

Personnel
 Rosemary Clooney – vocal
 Scott Hamilton - tenor saxophone
 Warren Vache - cornet and flugelhorn
 David Ladd - flute
 Cal Tjader - vibraphone
 Nat Pierce - piano
 Cal Collins - guitar
 Bob Maize - bass
 Jake Hanna - drums

References

1982 albums
Cole Porter tribute albums
Concord Records albums
Rosemary Clooney albums